The degree of religiosity in the population of the United States can be compared to that in other countries and compared state-by-state, based on individual self-assessment and polling data.

Methodologies
The Gallup Poll assesses religiosity around the world, asking "Is religion important in your daily life?" and in the United States by state, asking the degree to which respondents consider themselves to be religious. The Pew Research Center and Public Religion Research Institute have conducted studies of reported frequency of attendance to religious service. The Harris Poll has conducted surveys of the percentage of people who believe in God.

Results

Religious Denominations (Pew Research 2014)

Religions by metropolitan areas

Attendance 

In a 2009 Gallup International survey, 41.6% of American citizens said that they attended church or synagogue once a week or almost every week. This percentage is higher than other surveyed Western countries. In answering, "Is religion important in your daily life," the Gallup organization reported a U.S. response of 65% reporting yes, compared to the United Kingdom with a 27% affirmative response. Church attendance varies considerably by state and region. The figures ranged from 63% in Mississippi to 23% in Vermont. The most religious region of the United States is American Samoa (99.3% religious).
Gallup measure of religiosity by country in 2009

A 2013 survey reported that 31% of Americans attend religious services at least weekly. It was conducted by the Public Religion Research Institute with a margin of error of 2.5. In 2006, a world-wide online Harris Poll surveyed 2,010 U.S. adults and found that 26% of those surveyed attended religious services "every week or more often", 9% went "once or twice a month", 21% went "a few times a year", 3% went "once a year", 22% went "less than once a year", and 18% never attend religious services. A 2013 Harris Poll reported an 8% decline in a belief in God, since a prior 2009 poll.

According to a 2011 Gallup poll, the state with the greatest percentage of respondents identifying as "very religious" was Mississippi (59%), and the state with the smallest percentage were Vermont and New Hampshire (23%), while Florida (39%) and Minnesota (40%) were near the median. A 2014 Pew Research poll found that the states with the greatest percentage of respondents who stated that religion was "very important" or "somewhat important" to their lives were Alabama (90%) and Louisiana (90%), which the state with smallest percentage was Vermont (57%).

U.S. states and Washington, D.C.

The table below displays the results of a 2017 survey by Pew Research:

U.S. territories
The following is the percentage of Christians and all religions in the U.S. territories as of 2015 (according to the ARDA):

Note that CIA World Factbook data differs from the data below. For example, the CIA World Factbook says that 99.3% of the population in American Samoa is religious.

See also

 Bible belt
 Demographics of the United States: Religion
 Freedom of religion in the United States
 Historical religious demographics of the United States
 Religion in the United States

References

Religiosity

Religious demographics
United States, religiosity
History of religion in the United States